Legionella fairfieldensis is a Gram-negative bacterium from the genus Legionella  with a single polar flagellum, which was isolated from cooling tower water in Fairfield, Victoria.

References

External links
Type strain of Legionella fairfieldensis at BacDive -  the Bacterial Diversity Metadatabase

Legionellales
Bacteria described in 1991